Bottaro is a surname. Notable people with the surname include:

Amedeo Bottaro (born 1971), Italian politician
Juan Bottaro (born 1988), Argentine footballer
Julián Bottaro (born 1992), Argentine footballer
Luciano Bottaro (1931–2006), Italian comic book artist
Viviana Bottaro (born 1987), Italian karateka

Italian-language surnames